The North/South Language Body (Ulster-Scots: Tha Noarth/Sooth Boord o Leid or The Language Curn) is an implementation body, provided for by the Belfast Agreement, that exists to implement policies agreed by Ministers in the North/South Ministerial Council (NSMC) in Republic of Ireland and Northern Ireland  with regard to the Irish and Ulster-Scots (or "Ullans") languages on a cross border all Island basis.

It is a single body reporting to the North/South Ministerial Council, but composed of two separate and largely autonomous agencies: Foras na Gaeilge, the Irish language agency, and Tha Boord o Ulstèr-Scotch, the Ulster-Scots Agency.

References

External links
Language Body - North-South Ministerial Council 
Foras na Gaeilge - official website
Tha Boord o Ulstèr-Scotch - official website
The North/South Language Body - annual report 2000

Language regulators
Languages of the Republic of Ireland
Languages of Northern Ireland
British–Irish Agreement implementation bodies